China Railway comprehensive inspection trains, or CITs, are high-speed test trains used on the high-speed rail network of China and the Jakarta-Bandung High Speed Rail in Indonesia are normally owned and operated by China Railway or the China Academy of Railway Sciences (CARS) and Kereta Cepat Indonesia China.

CIT trains are equipped with special devices to monitor the conditions of the track, the wheel-rail force, a catenary-pantograph communications system, and a signal system. Stock is usually painted with yellow bands and the words "高速综合检测列车" (meaning "High-speed Comprehensive Inspection Train") are usually painted on the side. The designs of most CITs are based on originally commercial designs, like the CIT001 (based on CRH5) and CIT400A (based on CRH380A). However, the CIT380A trainset was converted from a prototype of CRH380A (CRH2-150C). Some re-vamped commercial trains used for testing purposes are not designated as CITs and have standard serial numbers appended with a "J" (e.g. CRH380AJ). This stands for "Jiǎn" (inspection).

List of CIT trains

CRH5J-0501 

CRH5J-0501 (original designation, CIT001) is an 8-car trainset based on the CRH5 design, which serves as a  test train.

The CIT001 was ordered by the China Academy of Railway Science on 2 April 2007 and was co-designed by CARS and CNR. The official name is Code Zero Comprehensive Inspection Train. The train is painted with yellow and white striped livery and started test runs on 1 July 2007. It came into service on 6 June 2008.

Formation

CRH2A-2010 

CRH2A-2010 (formerly CRH2-010A) is the first high-speed test train in China and the first CRH2 trainset manufactured by CSR Sifang. The trainset rolled off the production line on 31 July 2006. In March 2007 it was converted to be a  test train. The train is equipped with ATP, signal parameter monitoring, wireless field monitoring, pantograph and catenary monitoring, track geometry monitoring, dynamics and acceleration detecting devices and a circuit-monitoring system.

CRH2C-2061 

The trainset rolled off the production line on 22 December 22, 2007 and was named CRH2-300, as the prototype of CRH2C. It now serves as a 350 km/h inspection train, equipped with track inspection, catenary examination, and signal inspection devices.

CRH2C-2068 

CRH2C-2068 (formerly CRH2-068C) is a  inspection train, equipped with track inspection, dynamics performance monitor and pantograph/catenary inspection devices.

CRH2C-2150 

It is converted from the prototype vehicle CRH380A. The original train, CRH2-150C, was rolled off the production line in April 2010. The eight-car train was modified to a CIT train after a series of tests for the design of CRH380A, and was delivered in November 2010.

Formation

CRH380AJ-0201/0202/0203/0206 
The CRH400A-001 (initially CIT400A) is the first ever  CIT train of China, based on the CRH380A design. The 8-car trainset was manufactured by CSR Sifang factory and rolled off the production line on February 22, 2011.

Development on the CIT400A started in June 2010. On February 23, 2011, the CRH400A-001 arrived at CARS; after a series of modifications to rectify problems that occurred during testing, the trainset was set to enter service on March 3, performing inspection work on the Jinghu HSR.

CRH380BJ-0301 

The CRH380BJ-0301 (initially CIT400B) is a  CIT train, co-manufactured by the CNR Tangshan and CNR Changchun factories.

Formation

CRH380AM-0204/CIT500/CRH500 

On December 7, 2010, during the 7th World High-speed Rail Conference held in Beijing, an officer from the CSR Group confirmed that China would perform a high-speed test in 2011 in an attempt to break the then current speed record of  achieved by French trainset V150. This confirmed that CSR was developing the CIT500 (later renamed CRH380AM) trainset.

On December 22, 2011, the train, officially named "Higher Speed Experimental Train", rolled off the production line. It is scheduled to enter testing in the near future.

CRH2J-0205
CRH2J-0205 is a modified CRH2E. Converted from CRH2-139E. The train set is painted in an orange livery and is used for inspection work.

CRH380BJ-A-0504

CR400BF-J-0511 

CR400BF-J-0511 is based on the CR400BF-C which was designed for the Beijing–Zhangjiakou intercity railway. The train has its bogies of cars 3 and 6 equipped with eddy current brake.

See also 
 China Railways CRH1
 China Railways CRH2
 China Railways CRH3
 China Railways CRH5
 China Railways CRH380A
 China Railways CRH6
 Doctor Yellow, high-speed inspection trains on the Japanese Shinkansen network
 TGV Iris 320, high-speed inspection trains on the French TGV network

Notes

External links
 Official CIT500 Prototype Model Train

Electric multiple units of China
Changchun Railway Vehicles
Alstom high-speed trains
Non-passenger multiple units